House Gang could refer to:

 House Gang, an Australian comedy series
 List of Wu-Tang Clan affiliates (Inspectah Deck's group)